Meena Ally is a Tanzanian radio and television presenter and actress known for her radio program Niambie, hosted by BBC Media Action, which addresses youth issues and influences engagement of young people in development. She is an advocate for youth and women rights in Tanzania.

She has worked on an infotainment evening drive show "Amplifaya" alongside popular media personality and news reporter Millard Ayo. She now works for a youth entertainment program on Clouds "XXL" in which she has managed to reach a young audience and interview various international artists such as Rema, Joe boy, Korede Bello, John Amos from Coming to America, Patoranking, Dj Maphorisa and many Tanzania A-list artists as well. She also hosts a television show on Clouds TV "Washa Kideo" which usually has different Tanzanian artists performing live and live interviews with Meena Ally and co-host Kenedy the Remedy.

In 2020, Meena won most preferred female media professional of the year at the Tanzania Consumer Choice Awards.

In her acting career, Ally made her debut in television by starring in a comic sitcom "Mjumbe" and has now acted in an animation film to be released on 20 August 2021 under the name "Mbuland"

Ally was also mentioned on The Citizen Magazine on the 2021–2021 list of women who influence the digital space.

Ally participated in the Tanzanian entrepreneurship project of empowering women titled "Malkia wa Nguvu", meaning "the powerful struggling Queen", which aims to entice women for self-employment and fighting for their rights.

Career 
Working experience Career

References

External links 
 
 My Media Action films: Meena Ally, Tanzania

Living people
Tanzanian radio presenters
1993 births
Tanzanian television presenters
Tanzanian actresses